Chinonyelum Pius “Chinonye” Ohadugha  (born 24 March 1986) is a Nigerian triple jumper.

In 2006, she finished fourth at the Commonwealth Games. In 2007, she won the silver medal at the All-Africa Games with a jump of 14.21 metres, a new Nigerian record. She did not reach the final round at the 2007 World Championships, but won the bronze medal at the 2008 African Championships. She competed at the 2008 Olympic Games without reaching the final.

She also finished fifth in 4 x 100 metres relay at the 2005 Summer Universiade.

Competition record

References

External links

2006 Commonwealth Games bio

1986 births
Living people
Nigerian female triple jumpers
Athletes (track and field) at the 2008 Summer Olympics
Olympic athletes of Nigeria
Igbo sportspeople
Athletes (track and field) at the 2006 Commonwealth Games
African Games silver medalists for Nigeria
African Games medalists in athletics (track and field)
Athletes (track and field) at the 2007 All-Africa Games
Competitors at the 2005 Summer Universiade
Commonwealth Games competitors for Nigeria
21st-century Nigerian women